Stigmadiscus Rasetti, 1966, is a genus of Lower Cambrian Eodiscinid trilobite belonging to the family Weymouthiidae Kobayashi (1943)  Order Agnostida (Salter 1864)  It lived during the Botomian stage, = late Lower Cambrian Stage 4 (upper of two stages subdividing the un-named Series 2); the upper Botomian Stage boundary corresponds to base of both the Middle Cambrian Wuliuan stage and Miaolingian Series.

Stigmadiscus resembles Acidiscus in having a relatively short glabella, distinct S1 and S2 lateral furrows, and a slender occipital spine. In fact, according to Cotton & Fortey (2005, fig. 3)  consensus is that Stigmadiscus and Bolboparia Rasetti, 1966, are sister taxa of Acidiscus.

References

Cambrian trilobites
Weymouthiidae
Agnostida genera
Cambrian trilobites of North America

Cambrian genus extinctions